Lieutenant-Colonel Bertram Best-Dunkley VC (3 August 1890 – 5 August 1917) was an English recipient of the Victoria Cross, the highest and most prestigious award for gallantry in the face of the enemy that can be awarded to British and Commonwealth forces.

Best-Dunkley was 26 years old, and a temporary lieutenant-colonel in the 2/5th Battalion, The Lancashire Fusiliers (part of the 55th (West Lancashire) Division, British Army during the First World War on 31 July 1917 at Wieltje, Belgium, during the attack on Pilckem Ridge as part of the Battle of Passchendaele, when the following deed took place for which he was awarded the VC.

Before enlisting, Best-Dunkley was a teacher at Tienstin Grammar School. There is a marble memorial plaque to him in the entrance hall of the School which was partially defaced by Japanese troops during their occupation of China.

References

Further reading
Details
Monuments to Courage (David Harvey, 1999)
The Register of the Victoria Cross (This England, 1997)
VCs of the First World War - Passchendaele 1917 (Stephen Snelling, 1998)

External links
, by Thomas Hope Floyd, from Project Gutenberg

1890 births
1917 deaths
British World War I recipients of the Victoria Cross
Lancashire Fusiliers officers
British Army personnel of World War I
British military personnel killed in World War I
British Army recipients of the Victoria Cross
Military personnel from York